Asking Alexandria is the fifth studio album by British rock band Asking Alexandria. It was released on 15 December 2017 through Sumerian Records. This is their first album since the return of original lead vocalist Danny Worsnop, as well as their first album working with producers Matt Good and Jonathan Davis instead of longtime producer Joey Sturgis. It also marks the group's slight departure from their heavier metalcore roots and towards a more straight forward and melodic hard rock sound. On 27 December 2019, the deluxe version of the album titled LP5 DLX was released.

Composition

Style
This album has been described as hard rock, metalcore, and post-hardcore, with elements of pop.

Release and promotion
On 21 September 2017, the band released the lead single "Into the Fire" from the album. The band released a second single from the album, entitled "Where Did It Go?", on 25 October 2017. On 25 May 2018, the band released the third single "Alone in a Room" alongside an accompanying lyric video. On 15 December, the band released their fourth single "Vultures" and its corresponding animated music video.

Critical reception

Asking Alexandria received generally positive reviews from critics. At Metacritic, which assigns a normalised rating out of 100 to reviews from mainstream critics, the album has an average score of 73 out of 100 based on 4 reviews, indicating "generally favorable reviews". AllMusic gave the album a positive review saying, "Overall, Asking Alexandria is a worthy return from the classic lineup, retaining the best aspects of its past and taking steps into its future. Regardless of a stumble or two, Asking Alexandria is well worth a listen. While The Black was a passable offering at a time when it seemed like it would be a permanent arrangement, this reunion simply feels right."

Michacel Hann at The Guardian stating, "The York quintet are the model of an If-You-Like-This-Sort-of-Thing band – huge, monolithic sheets of sound, precision-tooled to get large crowds putting their hands in the air. The formula is shaken up – a furious Slipknot-esque break is put in the middle of Into the Air; 'Hopelessly Hopeful' and 'When the Lights Come On' dial down the metal and ramp up the pop – but you're never more than a couple of minutes away from some preposterous chorus. It doesn't sound like Def Leppard, but it is reminiscent of that band's willingness to smooth off metal's rough edges and boost the melodies." Louder Sound gave the album a positive review and stated: "Ultimately, then, Asking Alexandria isn't a throwback or a sidestep – it's a whole new animal, and it's gonna need a bigger zoo."

Track listing

Personnel 
Credits adapted from AllMusic.

Asking Alexandria
 Danny Worsnop – lead vocals, additional guitar
 Ben Bruce – lead guitar, backing vocals, vocals on track 11
 Cameron Liddell – rhythm guitar
 Sam Bettley – bass
 James Cassells – drums

Additional musicians
 Bingx – guest vocals on track 11
 Hyro the Hero – guest vocals on track 15

Additional personnel
 Matt Good – production, engineering, keyboards, programming
 Jonathan Davis – production
 Will Beasley and Ryan Daminson – engineering
 Taylor Larson – mixing
 Ted Jensen – mastering
 Don Sepulveda – management
 Ash Avildsen and Nick Walters – A&R
 Daniel McBride – artwork, layout
 Sanjay Parikh – band photo
 Steven Contreras – photography

Charts

References

2017 albums
Asking Alexandria albums
Sumerian Records albums
Albums produced by Matt Good